Tomáš Žižka (born October 10, 1979) is a Czech professional ice hockey defenseman currently playing for Hokej Vyškov of the 2nd Czech Republic Hockey League, the third-tier league in the Czech Republic. He previously played 25 games in the National Hockey League with the Los Angeles Kings during the 2002–03 and 2003–04 seasons. The rest of his career, which began in 1997, has mainly been spent in the Czech Extraliga.

Playing career
Žižka was drafted 163rd overall by the Los Angeles Kings in the 1998 NHL Entry Draft. He played 25 career NHL games, scoring 2 goals and 6 assists for 8 points.

Career statistics

Regular season and playoffs

International

External links

 

1979 births
Living people
Czech ice hockey defencemen
Czech expatriate ice hockey players in Russia
HC Kometa Brno players
HC Slavia Praha players
HC Spartak Moscow players
PSG Berani Zlín players
Los Angeles Kings draft picks
Los Angeles Kings players
Manchester Monarchs (AHL) players
People from Šternberk
Sportspeople from the Olomouc Region
Czech expatriate ice hockey players in the United States